Lestrolepis is a genus of barracudina.

Species
There are currently four recognized species in this genus:
 Lestrolepis intermedia (Poey, 1868)
 Lestrolepis japonica (S. Tanaka (I), 1908) (Japanese barracudina)
 Lestrolepis luetkeni (Ege, 1933) (Naked barracuda)
 Lestrolepis pofi (Harry, 1953) (Christmas Island pike smelt)

References

Paralepididae